The U.S. embassy in the Green Zone of Bagdhad, Iraq, was attacked on 31 December 2019 by Kata'ib Hezbollah militiamen and their Popular Mobilization Forces (PMF) supporters and sympathizers. The attack was prompted by the U.S. airstrikes on 29 December 2019 that targeted weapons depots and command and control installations of Kata'ib Hezbollah across Iraq and Syria.

The attack occurred amidst the backdrop of the 2019–2021 Persian Gulf crisis, leading the United States to blame Iran and its non-state allies in Iraq for orchestrating the attack, which Iran denied. The U.S. responded by sending hundreds of additional troops to the Persian Gulf region, including approximately 100 U.S. Marines to reinforce security at the Baghdad embassy. No deaths or serious injuries occurred during the attack and protesters never breached the main compound.

Background

On 27 December 2019, an Iraqi airbase in Kirkuk province was attacked with rockets, killing an American civilian contractor and injuring four U.S. service members and two Iraqi security forces personnel. The U.S. blamed the Iranian-backed Kata'ib Hezbollah militia, a subgroup of Iraq's Popular Mobilization Forces (PMF), for the attack.

On 29 December 2019, retaliatory U.S. airstrikes targeted five Kata'ib Hezbollah —and therefore PMF— weapon storage facilities and command and control locations in Iraq and Syria. At least 25 militia members reportedly died and at least 55 were wounded. Iraq's Prime Minister Adil Abdul-Mahdi condemned the airstrikes while U.S. special envoy Brian Hook said the strikes were a message directed at Iran.

Attack

Mob attack
On 31 December 2019, after a funeral was held for the Kata'ib Hezbollah militiamen that were killed by the prior U.S. airstrikes, an angry mob of dozens of Iraqi Shiite militiamen and their supporters marched through the perimeters of Baghdad's heavily fortified Green Zone, marched down Kindi Street, and surrounded an entrance to the U.S. embassy compound. According to the Associated Press, Iraqi security forces did not attempt to stop the mob and permitted them to pass a security checkpoint.

The mob began taunting the security personnel of the embassy reception area's front gatehouse checkpoint near the embassy's parking lot and chanting "down, down USA", "Death to America" and "Death to Israel". They scaled and threw stones and water bottles over the walls and attacked gates, windows, and doors with makeshift rams. Dozens of the demonstrators then smashed through a main door of the checkpoint, set fire to the reception area, raised PMF militia flags and anti-American posters and sprayed anti-American graffiti. Video of the demonstration reportedly also showed militiamen ransacking the reception area and taking away paperwork. Security staff withdrew to the embassy; there was no immediate comment from the Pentagon and the U.S. State Department on the situation. U.S. ambassador to Iraq Matt Tueller was not at the embassy at the time and was away on previously scheduled "personal travel".

As the fire broke out, an AP reporter on the scene observed at least half a dozen U.S. Marine Security Guardsmen and Diplomatic Security Service personnel on the roof of the main embassy building with their guns trained on the intruders, many of whom were wearing militia uniforms; the intruders stopped in a corridor after about 5 meters (16 feet), and were about 200 meters away from the main embassy building. There were also reports of tear gas being deployed to disperse the intruders as at least three protesters appeared to have difficulties breathing. The mob subsequently set fire to three trailers used by security guards along the embassy compound's wall. Reportedly, a man on a loudspeaker urged the mob not to enter the compound, saying: "The message was delivered." Some commanders from Iranian-backed Iraqi militia factions began joining the protesters, including chief of the Badr Organization and PMF commander Hadi al-Amiri and leader of the Iranian-backed "Special Groups" paramilitary collective Qais Khazali. Iraq's interior minister Yassine al-Yasseri was also briefly at the scene, calling the situation "...embarrassing to the [Iraqi] government."

By early evening, the mob, which at one point numbered in several hundreds, had largely retreated and protesters had set up tents outside the embassy in an attempted sit-in. Kata'ib Hezbollah spokesman Jaafar al-Husseini claimed the protestors had no intention of storming the embassy and that the sit-in was to continue "until American troops leave Iraq and the embassy is closed." Many of those who participated in the greater Iraqi protests condemned the prior U.S. airstrikes on PMF positions in Iraq, saying that "[d]emonstrations at [the] US embassy are a natural response to the US strikes over Hashd positions in Iraq", but also condemned the attack on the American embassy, saying, "we are staying here in the hub of the peaceful protest movement" and adding that the "crowds in the Green Zone do not represent us. We want peaceful change."

Secretary of State Mike Pompeo would later identify Abu Mahdi al-Muhandis, Qais Khazali, Falih Alfayyadh, and Hadi al-Amiri as leaders of the attack on the embassy.

Security response

After the news of the embassy compound's perimeter breach, U.S. Defense Secretary Mark Esper stated that reinforcements were en route to the compound and urged the Iraqi government to "fulfill its international responsibilities" and protect the facility. About five hours after the violence first erupted, 30 Iraqi soldiers in seven armored vehicles arrived and deployed near the embassy walls but not near the burning, breached checkpoint. Reportedly, four vehicles carrying riot police later approached the embassy but were forced back by the protesters who blocked their path. A detachment of approximately 100 U.S. Marines assigned to a crisis response unit in Kuwait, Special Purpose Marine Air-Ground Task Force – Crisis Response – Central Command (SPMAGTF-CR-CC), along with two U.S. Army AH-64 Apache attack helicopters from Taji, Iraq were deployed to secure the embassy. Mark Esper subsequently announced the immediate deployment of an infantry battalion of about 750 U.S. soldiers from the 82nd Airborne Division to the Middle East. He did not specify their destination, but a U.S. official familiar with the decision said they were to deploy to Kuwait. Esper said additional soldiers from the 82nd Airborne's quick-deployment brigade, known officially as its Immediate Response Force, were prepared to deploy over the next several days. The 750 soldiers deploying immediately were in addition to 14,000 U.S. troops sent to the Persian Gulf region since May 2019 in response to concerns about Iranian aggression.

On 1 January 2020, the protests flared up again as demonstrators started a fire on the roof of the reception area, reportedly prompting U.S. Marines to fire tear gas at the crowd, without any significant injuries to the protesters or guards. Iraqi soldiers, federal police, and counterterrorism units lined up between the protesters and the compound. No further clashes occurred as Popular Mobilization Forces militia leaders called on demonstrators to take down the tents and withdraw. Militia supporters considered the attack on the embassy a victory against the U.S. and that their message had been sent, with one supporter proclaiming "We rubbed America's nose in the dirt." The U.S. State Department said all American personnel were safe and that there were no plans to evacuate the embassy.

Aftermath

U.S. President Donald Trump accused Iran of "orchestrating" the attack on the embassy and added that they would be held "fully responsible." U.S. Secretary of State Mike Pompeo named then-Popular Mobilization Forces deputy chief Abu Mahdi al-Muhandis, Asa'ib Ahl al-Haq leader Qais Khazali and PMF commander Hadi al-Amiri (both of which were present at the embassy attack), and PMF chairman Falih Alfayyadh as responsible for the attack; al-Amiri and Alfayyadh were reportedly guests to the White House during the Obama administration. Iran's foreign ministry denied they were behind the protests at the U.S. embassy and warned against any retaliation. Supreme leader of Iran Ali Khamenei tweeted "If Iran wants to fight a country, it will strike directly."

Israeli Foreign Minister Israel Katz held Iran responsible for the embassy attack, saying that Iran had made a "grave mistake" by attacking the embassy and called on the international community to confront what he called the "rebel regime" in Tehran.

On 2 January 2020, U.S. Defense Secretary Mark Esper said "the game has changed" and stated that the U.S. would preemptively strike Iranian-backed paramilitary groups in Iraq if there were indications they were preparing to attack U.S. forces, while also urging the Iraqi government to resist Iranian influence. U.S. Chairman of the Joint Chiefs of Staff Mark Milley emphasized that any group that attempted to overrun the Baghdad embassy will "run into a buzzsaw."

Hours after Esper's announcement, in the early morning hours of 3 January 2020, the U.S. conducted a drone strike, killing the commander of Iran's Quds Force, Major General Qasem Soleimani, and Abu Mahdi al-Muhandis while they were traveling in a convoy near Baghdad International Airport. The U.S. attack was formally announced by the United States Department of Defense in a press release. Iran retaliated by attacking U.S. bases in Iraq, primarily Al Asad Airbase, with tens of ballistic missiles; there were no deaths in the attack but 110 U.S. soldiers received brain concussions and at least 5 structures were destroyed.

On 26 January 2020, three more rockets were fired on the U.S. embassy wounding at least one staff member present in the cafeteria at dinner time, with the nationality of the wounded still undisclosed, other sources reported 3 wounded.

In autumn 2020, U.S. Secretary of State Mike Pompeo repeatedly threatened to close the U.S. Embassy in Baghdad if Iraqi leaders did not prevent further attacks on the embassy. According to some media sources, Pompeo informed Baghdad that it would target 120 sites in Iraq linked to Iran-backed militias if rocket attacks cost American lives.

See also
 2012 Benghazi attack
 Iran hostage crisis

References

External links

2019 in international relations
2010s crimes in Baghdad
December 2019 events in Iraq
January 2020 events in Iraq
Attacks on buildings and structures in 2019
Attacks on buildings and structures in Baghdad
Attacks on diplomatic missions in Iraq
Attacks on diplomatic missions of the United States
Iran–Iraq relations
Iran–United States relations
Iraq–United States relations
Presidency of Donald Trump